The 1974 British League Division Two season was the second tier of motorcycle speedway in Great Britain. It was the final season of British League Division Two before it was renamed as the New National League.

Summary
The league was again expanded by one team from 18 to 19 teams. Weymouth Wizards were the new addition to the league, returning to action after five years out. Additionally there were two in and two out; Hull Vikings had moved up to the British League swapping places with Coatbridge Tigers and also swapping their top riders. Rayleigh Rockets closed down but the promotion, riders and nickname moved to Rye House. It was the first season of speedway at Rye House since the 1959 Southern Area League.  

There were a few changes of nicknames; the Chesterton Potters changed their team name to the Stoke Potters, Bradford became the Barons, Sunderland became the Stars and Long Eaton raced as the Archers.

Birmingham Brummies won their first title, completing a league and cup double. Australian Phil Herne improved his average by over 3 points from the 1973 season and Arthur Browning also exceeded a 10 average, the two factors proved to be the catalyst for Birmingham's success. John Hart and George Major both scored heavily throughout the season too.

Final table

British League Division Two Knockout Cup
The 1974 British League Division Two Knockout Cup was the seventh edition of the Knockout Cup for tier two teams. Birmingham Brummies were the winners of the competition.

First round

Second round

Quarter-finals

Semi-finals

Final
First leg

Second leg

Birmingham were declared Knockout Cup Champions, winning on aggregate 81–74.

Leading final averages

Riders & final averages
Barrow

Tom Owen 8.54 
Dave Baugh 8.46
Terry Kelly 8.00 
Sid Sheldrick 7.77 
Paul O'Neal 7.37 
Joe Owen 7.36 
Chris Roynon 6.12 
Mick Sheldrick 3.40
Graham Tattersall 2.74

Berwick

Brian Havelock 7.70
Willie Templeton 7.27
Graham Jones 6.80
Jim Wells 6.67
Doug Templeton 6.59
Denny Morter 6.00
Alf Wells 5.84
Colin Farquharson 5.67
Dave Trownson 4.90
Ian Wilson 3.76
Robin Dixon 3.50

Birmingham

Phil Herne 10.48
Arthur Browning 10.14
John Hart 8.99
George Major 8.97
Ricky Day 6.55
Carl Askew 5.14
Keith Anderson 5.02
Alan Grahame 4.13

Boston

Carl Glover 10.29
Jim Ryman 8.07 
Russ Osborne 8.00 
David Gagen 7.15 
Rob Hollingworth 6.18 
Dave Piddock 5.89
Les Glover 5.07
Rob Mouncer 3.79
Billy Burton 2.97

Bradford

Alan Knapkin 9.33
Tony Featherstone 8.66
Colin Meredith 8.33
Mick Fairbairn 5.98
Mick Fishwick 5.63
Eddie Argall 5.16
Steve Wilcock 5.15
Roger Austin 4.76
Mick Fielding 4.74
Dave Parkin 2.70

Canterbury

Trevor Jones 8.84
Ted Hubbard 8.13
Dave Gooderham 7.28
Roger Johns 6.93
Barney Kennett 6.85 
Derek Cook 6.43 
Les Rumsey 6.38
Graham Clifton 4.74
Peter Murray 3.09
Jimmy Squibb 3.08

Coatbridge

Dave Gifford 8.82
Brian Collins 8.66
Robin Adlington 7.60
Jimmy Gallacher 7.38
Grahame Dawson 5.83
John Wilson 5.15
Eddie Argall 4.13
Chris Quigley 4.00
Mike Ferreira 3.33
Jim Beresford 2.74

Crewe

John Jackson 9.95 
Jack Millen 9.10 
Dave Morton 8.87
Keith White 7.43
Ian Cartwright 6.43
Les Ott 6.06
Cliff Anderson 5.72
Wayne Forrest 4.59
Mike Gardner 4.57
Stuart Cope 2.91
Paul Wells 2.12

Eastbourne

Bobby McNeil 8.77
Trevor Geer 8.46
Paul Gachet 8.29 
Mike Sampson 7.79
Neil Middleditch 7.72
Pete Jarman 6.99
Steve Weatherley 6.41
Martin Yeates 6.26
Eric Dugard 5.28

Ellesmere Port

Graham Drury 9.31 
Colin Goad 8.32 
Steve Taylor 7.36 
Nigel Wasley 6.16 
Wayne Hughes 6.05
Duncan Meredith 5.89
Gerald Smitherman 5.20
Nicky Allott 4.37
Ken Stafford 3.60
Steve Casey 2.71
Ray Hassall 2.16

Long Eaton

Geoff Bouchard 9.24
Alan Molyneux 8.23
Phil Bass 6.95
Alan Witt 5.05
Steve Finch 4.33
James Bond 4.06
Max Brown 3.90
Dave Harvey 3.90
Pip Austen 3.63
Harry MacLean 2.97

Peterborough

Mike Lanham 9.11
Brian Clark 8.73
Jack Walker 6.75
Ken Matthews 6.31
Roy Carter 6.29
Steve Osborn 6.12
Roy Sizmore 5.74
Peter Thompson 4.85
Eric Dugard 4.44
Chris Drewett 4.14

Rye House

Brian Foote 7.93
Steve Clarke 7.45
Clive Hitch 6.88
Trevor Barnwell 6.71
George Barclay 5.58
Peter Moore 5.39
Bob Young 5.31
John Gibbons 5.29
Bob Cooper 4.78
Pete Wigley 4.36

Scunthorpe

Tony Childs 8.82
Ken McKinlay 8.13 
Doug Underwood 6.56
Andy Sims 6.54
Keith Evans 6.07
Dingle Brown 6.04
Chris Emery 6.03
Jack Bywater 5.60
Tim Swales 4.50
Chris Doyle 4.14
Roger Pascall 2.86

Sunderland

Jim Wells 7.92 
Brian Havelock 7.23
Tim Swales 6.77
George Barclay 6.43
Russ Dent 6.15
Andy Meldrum 6.07
Dennis Gavros 5.00
Brian Johnson 4.00
Vic Harding 3.71
John Robson 2.82
Derek Fell 2.50

Stoke

Mike Broadbank 9.37
Geoff Pusey 7.46 
Brian Woodward 7.18
Steve Bastable 6.00
Alan Bridgett 5.97
Steve Holden 5.87
Nigel Wasley 5.64
Andy Cusworth 5.22
Mick Newton 2.67

Teesside
 
Bruce Forrester 9.39
Dave Durham 7.87 
Pete Reading 7.73
Roger Wright 7.12 
Russ Hodgson 6.42
Alan Emerson 5.14
Tony Swales 3.63
Merv Salt 3.29

Weymouth

Kelvin Mullarkey 7.19
Bob Hughes 6.77
Steve Lomas 6.36
Nigel Couzens 5.64
Geoff Swindells 5.51
Clark Facey 4.88
Russell Foot 4.88
Glyn Facey 4.80
Brian Paddington 4.28
Mark Sawyers 3.47

Workington

Mitch Graham 10.00 
Malcolm MacKay 8.77
Taffy Owen 8.42
Alan Cowland 7.28
Steve Watson 5.54
Darryl Stobbart 4.98
Bernie Hornby 4.14
Steve Lawson 1.68

See also
List of United Kingdom Speedway League Champions
Knockout Cup (speedway)

References

Speedway British League Division Two / National League